The Phoenix City Council is the governing body of the city of Phoenix, Arizona. The council is made up of nine members, including a mayor and eight council members representing individual districts. While the mayor is elected in a citywide election, city council members are elected by votes only in the districts they represent, with both the mayor and council members serving four year terms.  The current mayor of Phoenix is Kate Gallego, a Democrat, who won the seat after defeating her former fellow-council member, Daniel Valenzuela in a run-off election in March 2019. In setting city policy and passing rules and regulations, the mayor and city council members each have equal voting power.

History
Before 1948, the city of Phoenix was governed by commission. In 1948, the system was changed to a city council with a mayor selected in a run-off election in non-partisan elections. In 1982, the election system was changed so that councilors represented districts.

Members

References

Politics of Arizona
Government of Phoenix, Arizona
City councils in the United States
1948 establishments in Arizona